Donald W. Loveland (born December 26, 1934 in Rochester, New York) is a professor emeritus of computer science at Duke University who specializes in artificial intelligence. He is well known for the Davis–Putnam–Logemann–Loveland algorithm.

Loveland graduated from Oberlin College in 1956, received a master's degree from the Massachusetts Institute of Technology in 1958 and a Ph.D. from New York University in 1964. He joined the Duke University Computer Science Department in 1973. He previously served as a faculty member in the Department of Mathematics at New York University and Carnegie Mellon University.

He received the Herbrand Award for Distinguished Contributions to Automated Reasoning in 2001. He is a Fellow of the Association for Computing Machinery (2000), a Fellow of the Association of Artificial Intelligence (1993), and a Fellow of the American Association for the Advancement of Science (2019).

Bibliography
Books

Selected papers

See also
Model elimination

References

External links
 Publication list at DBLP

20th-century American mathematicians
21st-century American mathematicians
1934 births
Living people
Oberlin College alumni
Massachusetts Institute of Technology alumni
New York University alumni
Duke University faculty
American computer scientists
Artificial intelligence researchers
Fellows of the Association for the Advancement of Artificial Intelligence
Fellows of the Association for Computing Machinery